Gwendoline Alice Porter (25 April 190229 August 1993) was a British track and field athlete who competed mainly in the 100 metres. She was born in Ilford, London. She worked in the head office of an insurance company.

In 1922 she participated at the Women's Olympiad in Paris and won the gold medal in the 4×110 yds relay (with Mary Lines, Nora Callebout, Daisy Leach and Porter as fourth runner) setting a new world record.

In 1932 she was one of five women entered by the Women's Amateur Athletic Association at the 1932 Los Angeles Summer Olympics as Britain's first female Olympians in athletics events, together with Ethel Johnson, Eileen Hiscock, Nellie Halstead, and seventeen-year-old Violet Webb. They sailed for five days from Southampton to Quebec and then travelled a further 3000 miles by train before arriving in Los Angeles. In the 4 x 100 metres women's relay she won the bronze medal with her teammates Eileen Hiscock, Violet Webb (replacing the injured Johnson) and Nellie Halstead. In the women's 100 metres she came 4th in her heat.

References

1902 births
1993 deaths
People from Ilford
Athletes from London
English female sprinters
Olympic athletes of Great Britain
Olympic bronze medallists for Great Britain
Athletes (track and field) at the 1932 Summer Olympics
English Olympic medallists
Medalists at the 1932 Summer Olympics
Olympic bronze medalists in athletics (track and field)
Olympic female sprinters